Piz Platta is the highest peak in the Oberhalbstein Alps. It is 3392 metres high (Source: Landeskarte der Schweiz no.1256 - 1991), and is notable for its similarity in shape to the Matterhorn. Piz Platta is located between the localities of Avers and Mulegns, both in the Swiss canton of Graubünden.

See also
List of mountains of Graubünden
List of most isolated mountains of Switzerland

References

External links

 Piz Platta on Summitpost
 Piz Platta on Hikr

Platta
Alpine three-thousanders
Platta
Mountains of Switzerland
Surses